Iluppaiyur may refer to:
Iluppaiyur, Tiruchirappalli district, Tamil Nadu, India
Iluppaiyur, Virudhunagar district, Tamil Nadu, India